The Merz Aesthetics Women's Challenger (previously known as the RBC Bank Women's Challenger) was a tennis tournament held in Raleigh, North Carolina, a city in United States. Held since 2004, this ITF Circuit event was a $25,000 tournament played on outdoor clay courts. The event was previously a $75,000 and $50,000 tournament.

Past finals

Singles

Doubles

See also
List of tennis tournaments

External links
Official website  
ITF Search

Sports in Raleigh, North Carolina
Clay court tennis tournaments
ITF Women's World Tennis Tour
Recurring sporting events established in 2004
Recurring sporting events disestablished in 2015
Tennis in North Carolina
Defunct tennis tournaments in the United States
2004 establishments in North Carolina
2015 disestablishments in North Carolina
Women's sports in North Carolina